Vinay kumar lal (born 22 March 1999) is an Indian Para athlete competing in Men's 100m, 200m, 400m events in the T44 category. He is bronze medallist in Asian Para Games 2018 held in  Jakarta, Indonesia. He also won bronze medal in 2019 World Para Athletics Championships held in Dubai, United Arab Emirates.

Early life 

Vinay kumar lal born in 1999 in Chandigarh and suffered from a Left leg lower limb polio by birth. Vinay, at a very early stage, represented his state in volleyball, playing alongside able-bodied athletes. In 2015, inspired by the movie about one of India’s greatest athletes, Milkha Singh, popularly known as "the Flying Sikh", Vinay started athletics .The same year, he won his first-ever national medal at the Nationals, winning two silvers in both the 200m and 400m.

Career 

Vinay was inspired by a film about one of India's greatest athletes, Milkha Singh, better known as the "Flying Sikh". Vinay took up athletics in 2015 and, in the same year, won both the 200m and 400m. He won his first medals at the national level by winning two silvers. At the Nationals held at Panchkula in 2016, he won two gold and missed a third by a small margin due to a hamstring pull in the 100m, eventually settling for bronze.
In 2017, Vinay won a gold and a silver in Beijing. Later that year, at the London World Championships, he finished fourth. In 2018, he won his first Asian Games medal and also won a bronze medal at the 2019 world para atheletic championship. He also won a gold medal in Marrakech Para Athletics Grand 2022.

References

External links
 
 

1999 births
Living people
Indian male sprinters
Medalists at the 2018 Asian Para Games
21st-century Indian people